Blackmont is an unincorporated community in Bell County, Kentucky, United States. At one time it was called Hulen. Its post office  is closed.

The community lies on the south side of the Cumberland River and US Route 119 passes the community on the north bank of the Cumberland.

References

Unincorporated communities in Bell County, Kentucky
Unincorporated communities in Kentucky